The 1991 All-Ireland Senior Hurling Championship was the 105th staging of the All-Ireland Senior Hurling Championship, the Gaelic Athletic Association's premier inter-county hurling tournament. The championship began on 19 May 1991 and ended on 1 September 1991.

Cork were the defending champions but were defeated by Tipperary in the Munster final replay. Westmeath qualified for the All-Ireland quarter-final as winners of the B championship.

On 1 September 1991, Tipperary won the championship following a 1–16 to 0–15 defeat of Kilkenny in the All-Ireland final. This was their 24th All-Ireland title, their second in three championship seasons.

Tipperary's Michael Cleary was the championship's top scorer with 3-35. Tipperary's Pat Fox was the choice for Texaco Hurler of the Year.

Results

Munster Senior Hurling Championship

Leinster Senior Hurling Championship

Ulster Senior Hurling Championship

All-Ireland Senior Hurling Championship

Top scorers

Season

Single game

Clean sheets

Broadcasting

The following matches were broadcast live on television in Ireland on RTÉ. In the United Kingdom Channel 4 broadcast live coverage of the All-Ireland final. Highlights of a number of other games were shown on The Sunday Game.

External links
1991 All-Ireland final on YouTube

References

All-Ireland Senior Hurling Championship